Cardinal Mooney High School is a private, Roman Catholic high school in Sarasota, Florida.  It is located in the Roman Catholic Diocese of Venice in Florida.

Background
Cardinal Mooney was established in 1959 as a Catholic high school in the Sarasota-Manatee area. Students in and from surrounding counties make up the majority of the school population. Enrollment is open to incoming ninth grade and transfer students from any school irrespective of religious affiliation. Community service, the Gospel faith, academics, elective offerings, and AP level instruction represent the foundation of the school's curriculum. After-school, extracurricular athletic, and club opportunities serve to educate the "whole child."

The school was named after Edward Cardinal Mooney, former Cardinal of the Roman Catholic Archdiocese of Detroit who had died in 1958. Father Joseph Daley founded Cardinal Mooney High School in 1959 under the instruction of Archbishop Joseph P. Hurley, D.D., of St. Augustine. It is one of several schools set up following Archbishop Hurley's policy of increasing the number of educational institutions in the Diocese of St. Augustine, which was divided in 1984 to include the Diocese of Venice.

Philosophy
Cardinal Mooney Catholic High School is a coeducational nationally accredited school that offers the rigorous AP Capstone Diploma, as well as full honors, Advanced Placement, dual enrollment, and learning strategies programs.

Mission statement 
Cardinal Mooney Catholic High School is a Christ-centered, college preparatory institution, that prepares students to serve and lead by nurturing spiritual growth, cultivating them to pursue academic excellence.

Notable alumni
 Ryan Jackson, Former MLB player (Florida Marlins, Seattle Mariners, Detroit Tigers)
 Joe Gruters, member of the Florida Senate representing the 23rd District

References

External links

Catholic secondary schools in Florida
Buildings and structures in Sarasota, Florida
Educational institutions established in 1959
High schools in Sarasota County, Florida
Roman Catholic Diocese of Venice in Florida
1959 establishments in Florida